The Greek First Army (Proti Stratia), is the highest formation of the Hellenic Army and its only extant field army.

Various English and German-language sources erroneously mention the existence of a First Army during the Greco-Italian War and the Battle of Greece (1940–41). The Greek Army did not employ an army-level command in this period. Leo Niehorster's website shows the higher organisation of the Greek Army on 15 August 1940, with the General Staff of the Army directly supervising five corps, three divisions, and the Thessaloniki Fortress.

The First Army was created in March 1947, during the Greek Civil War. It controlled the II and III Corps, with Volos as its headquarters. It was abolished on 10 February 1948, and re-established in 1951 with its HQ at Larissa, where it remains to this day. Its CO is always a lieutenant general.

Structure 

 First Army (1η Στρατιά), based at Larissa, Thessaly which includes
 IV Army Corps (Δ' Σώμα Στρατού - Δ' ΣΣ), based at Xanthi, Thrace
 I Infantry Division (I ΜΠ), based at Veroia, Macedonia
 II Mechanised Infantry Division (II Μ/Κ ΜΠ), based at Edessa, Macedonia

Emblem and Motto 
The emblem of the 1st Army is an Ancient Macedonian shield, emblazoned with the sun of Vergina. It symbolizes determination, strength and the will of the First Army.

The motto is "As long as (the sun) follows his course" (est' an (o ilios) tin aftin odon ii). Before the Battle of Plataea, Mardonius offered the Athenians peace terms, with the hope of dividing the Greek forces. The Athenians responded with "As long as the sun follows his course, as he does now, we shall not come to a compromise with Xerxes".

Sources 

 

Field armies of Greece
1951 establishments in Greece
Larissa